Events from the year 1742 in Ireland.

Incumbent
Monarch: George II

Events
 c. March – Newry Canal opened. On 28 March the Cope brings the first load of Tyrone coal carried from Lough Neagh to Dublin by this route.
 13 April – first performance of Handel's Messiah staged at Neal's Music Hall in Fishamble Street, Dublin in aid of local charities. Matthew Dubourg leads the orchestra. Handel leaves Ireland on 13 August.

Births
John Prendergast Smyth, 1st Viscount Gort, politician (died 1817).

Deaths
September 27 – Hugh Boulter, Anglican Primate of All Ireland (born 1672)
Full date unknown
James Arbuckle, poet and critic (born 1700).

References

 
Years of the 18th century in Ireland
Ireland
1740s in Ireland